Bugs Bunny's Bustin' Out All Over is a springtime-themed Looney Tunes television special which aired on CBS on May 21, 1980.

The special includes three new cartoons directed by Chuck Jones and Phil Monroe.

Featured cartoons

The cartoon shorts include:

 Portrait of the Artist as a Young Bunny (Bugs Bunny, Elmer Fudd)
 Spaced Out Bunny (Bugs Bunny, Marvin the Martian)
 Soup or Sonic (Wile E. Coyote and the Road Runner)

Credits
 Written, produced, and directed by Chuck Jones
 Co-direction: Phil Monroe
 Voice characterizations: Mel Blanc, Paul Julian
 Music: Dean Elliott

Home video
The special is included as a special feature on the Looney Tunes Golden Collection: Volume 5 DVD box set.

References

External links
 

1980 television specials
1980s American television specials
CBS television specials
Looney Tunes television specials
Films scored by Dean Elliott
Bugs Bunny films
Television shows directed by Chuck Jones